The women's 60 metres hurdles event at the 2019 European Athletics Indoor Championships was held on 2 March 2019 at 12:35 (heats), and on 3 March 2019 at 11:25 (semifinals) and 18:25 (final) local time.

Medalists

Records

Results

Heats
Qualification: First 3 in each heat (Q) and the next 4 fastest (q) advance to the Semi-Finals.

Semifinals

Qualification: First 3 in each heat (Q) and the next 2 fastest (q) advance to the Final.

Final

References

2019 European Athletics Indoor Championships
60 metres hurdles at the European Athletics Indoor Championships